Jean Demannez (15 February 1949 – 1 December 2021) was a Belgian politician. He served as mayor of Saint-Josse-ten-Noode in the Brussels-Capital Region from 1999 to 2012.

Biography
A member of the Socialist Party (PS), Demannez was elected schepen of the communal council of Saint-Josse-ten-Noode in January 1977.

Jazz
Demannez was passionate about jazz. As mayor, he founded the  festival and led the initiative for the foundation of Jazz Station, located in the old .

References

1949 births
2021 deaths
20th-century Belgian politicians
21st-century Belgian politicians
Mayors of places in Belgium
Members of the Parliament of the Brussels-Capital Region
Socialist Party (Belgium) politicians
People from Saint-Josse-ten-Noode